Louis Charles Trabut (12 July 1853 – 25 April 1929) was a French botanist and physician who was a native of Chambéry, department of Savoie. He is remembered for his work involving the flora of Algeria and Tunisia.

Trabut was a professor of natural history at the Faculty of Medicine and Pharmacy of Algiers, and also a consultant physician to the Mustapha Pacha hospital. With botanist Jules Aimé Battandier (1848–1922), he published several works on Algerian flora, that included the following:
 Flore de l'Algérie (Flora of Algeria) (1888–90).
 L'Algérie, le sol et les habitants, flore, faune, geologie, anthropologie, ressources agricoles et économiques (Algeria, the land and its people, Flora, fauna, geology, anthropology, agricultural resources and economics) (1898).
 Flore analytique et synoptique de l'Algérie et de la Tunisie (Flora analytic and synoptic of Algeria and Tunisia) (1905).

Honours
In 1881, mycologists Pier Andrea Saccardo and Casimir Roumeguère published a fungi genus (in the family Phyllachoraceae), Trabutia, which was named after Trabut.
In 1920, F.Stevens published Trabutiella, also in the family Phyllachoraceae.
Lastly, Joanne E.Taylor, K.D.Hyde & E.B.G.Jones in 2003 published Tribulatia which is a monotypic genus of fungi in the family Phyllachoraceae.

He also has several plant species named after him, such as the eucalyptus species Eucalyptus trabutii.

References 

 Index of Botanists (publications)
 L’école de médecine d’Alger: 1857 à 2007 (translated from French)

1853 births
1929 deaths
People from Chambéry
19th-century French botanists
Algerian physicians
20th-century French botanists